Emily Middlemas (born 26 September 1998), known professionally as ili (stylised in all lowercase), is a Scottish singer-songwriter. In 2016, she finished in fourth place in the thirteenth series of The X Factor. She also competed in the eleventh series of the programme, and reached judges' houses, but failed to reach the live shows. In 2019, she independently released her debut extended play, Changes.

Early life
Middlemas was born on 26 September 1998, in Glasgow, Scotland, and attended Woodfarm High School. Middlemas auditioned for Britain’s Got Talent at a young age.

Career
At the age of nine, Middlemas started her performing career in a band called Loud N Proud, and at thirteen, she began writing her own songs. In July 2014, Middlemas won TeenStar, an annual singing competition held in Birmingham. Later that year, she auditioned for the eleventh series of The X Factor, and reached judges' houses, but failed to proceed further.

Middlemas then returned to audition for the thirteenth series of The X Factor in 2016, singing a cover of Stevie Wonder's "Master Blaster (Jammin')". Middlemas was placed in the "girls" category and reached the live shows, where she was mentored by Simon Cowell. Following the eliminations of Gifty Louise in week 4 and Sam Lavery in week 6, Middlemas became Cowell's last remaining act in the competition. She was in the bottom two in the semi-final, against Matt Terry, and was eliminated in fourth place.

In 2017, Middlemas released her first single, "Lost and Found", after which she embarked on her debut headline tour across the United Kingdom. The Memory Lane Tour consisted of 11 dates. In March 2018, she released her second single, "Layla", a tribute to a young girl who died from neuroblastoma cancer. Later that year, she released two further singles, titled "Habit" and "Broken Record".

In August 2019, Middlemas announced that she had adopted the stage name ili. That same month, she released "A Little Bit" as her debht single as ili. In September 2019, "Changes" was released as the title track from her debut EP, Changes. On 1 November 2019, ili released the five-track EP Changes. She then released the single "Breath" on 8 May 2020. Two years later, ili released "Time Go By".

Personal life
Middlemas has been in a relationship with fellow The X Factor contestant Ryan Lawrie since 2015. In June 2022, the couple got engaged.

Discography

Extended plays

Singles

References

External links
 

 

1998 births
21st-century Scottish women singers
Living people
Musicians from Glasgow
Scottish singer-songwriters
The X Factor (British TV series) contestants